Postmodern music is music in the art music tradition produced in the postmodern era. It also describes any music that follows aesthetical and philosophical trends of postmodernism. As an aesthetic movement it was formed partly in reaction to modernism but is not primarily defined as oppositional to modernist music. Postmodernists question the tight definitions and categories of academic disciplines, which they regard simply as the remnants of modernity.

The postmodernist musical attitude
Postmodernism in music is not a distinct musical style, but rather refers to music of the postmodern era. Postmodernist music, on the other hand, shares characteristics with postmodernist art—that is, art that comes after and reacts against modernism (see Modernism in Music). Rebecca Day, Lecturer in Music Analysis, writes "within music criticism, postmodernism is seen to represent a conscious move away from the perceptibly damaging hegemony of binaries such as aestheticism/formalism, subject/object, unity/disunity, part/whole, that were seen to dominate former aesthetic discourse, and that when left unchallenged (as postmodernists claim of modernist discourse) are thought to de-humanise music analysis".

Fredric Jameson, a major figure in the thinking on postmodernism and culture, calls postmodernism "the cultural dominant of the logic of late capitalism", meaning that, through globalization, postmodern culture is tied inextricably with capitalism (Mark Fisher, writing 20 years later, goes further, essentially calling it the sole cultural possibility). Drawing from Jameson and other theorists, David Beard and Kenneth Gloag argue that, in music, postmodernism is not just an attitude but also an inevitability in the current cultural climate of fragmentation. As early as 1938, Theodor Adorno had already identified a trend toward the dissolution of "a culturally dominant set of values", citing the commodification of all genres as beginning of the end of genre or value distinctions in music.

In some respects, Postmodern music could be categorized as simply the music of the postmodern era, or music that follows aesthetic and philosophical trends of postmodernism, but with Jameson in mind, it is clear these definitions are inadequate. As the name suggests, the postmodernist movement formed partly in reaction to the ideals of modernism, but in fact postmodern music is more to do with functionality and the effect of globalization than it is with a specific reaction, movement, or attitude. In the face of capitalism, Jameson says, "It is safest to grasp the concept of the postmodern as an attempt to think the present historically in an age that has forgotten how to think historically in the first place".

Characteristics
Jonathan Kramer posits the idea (following Umberto Eco and Jean-François Lyotard) that postmodernism (including musical postmodernism) is less a surface style or historical period (i.e., condition) than an attitude. Kramer enumerates 16 (arguably subjective) "characteristics of postmodern music, by which I mean music that is understood in a postmodern manner, or that calls forth postmodern listening strategies, or that provides postmodern listening experiences, or that exhibits postmodern compositional practices." According to Kramer, postmodern music:

 is not simply a repudiation of modernism or its continuation, but has aspects of both a break and an extension
 is, on some level and in some way, ironic
 does not respect boundaries between sonorities and procedures of the past and of the present
 challenges barriers between 'high' and 'low' styles
 shows disdain for the often unquestioned value of structural unity
 questions the mutual exclusivity of elitist and populist values
 avoids totalizing forms (e.g., does not want entire pieces to be tonal or serial or cast in a prescribed formal mold)
 considers music not as autonomous but as relevant to cultural, social, and political contexts
 includes quotations of or references to music of many traditions and cultures
 considers technology not only as a way to preserve and transmit music but also as deeply implicated in the production and essence of music
 embraces contradictions
 distrusts binary oppositions
 includes fragmentations and discontinuities
 encompasses pluralism and eclecticism
 presents multiple meanings and multiple temporalities
 locates meaning and even structure in listeners, more than in scores, performances, or composers

Daniel Albright summarizes the main tendencies of musical postmodernism as:
Bricolage
Polystylism
Randomness

Timescale
One author has suggested that the emergence of postmodern music in popular music occurred in the late 1960s, influenced in part by psychedelic rock and one or more of the later Beatles albums. Beard and Gloag support this position, citing Jameson's theory that "the radical changes of musical styles and languages throughout the 1960s [are] now seen as a reflection of postmodernism". Others have placed the beginnings of postmodernism in the arts, with particular reference to music, at around 1930.

See also
List of postmodernist composers
20th-century classical music
21st-century classical music

References

Bibliography

Further reading

 
 
 
 
 
 
 
 
 
 
 
 
 
 
 
 
 
 
 
 
 
 
  
 
 
 Bertens, Hans. 1995. The Idea of the Postmodern: A History. London and New York: Routledge. .
 Beverley, John. 1989. "The Ideology of Postmodern Music and Left Politics". Critical Quarterly 31, no. 1 (Spring): 40–56.
 Burkholder, J. Peter. 1995. All Made of Tunes: Charles Ives and the Uses of Musical Borrowings. New Haven: Yale University Press.
 Danuser, Hermann. 1991. "Postmodernes Musikdenken—Lösung oder Flucht?". In Neue Musik im politischen Wandel: fünf Kongressbeiträge und drei Seminarberichte, edited by Hermann Danuser, 56–66. Mainz & New York: Schott. .
 Edwards, George. 1991. "Music and Postmodernism". Partisan Review 58, no. 4 (Fall): 693–705. Reprinted in his Collected Essays on Modern and Classical Music, with a foreword by Fred Lerdahl and an afterword by Joseph Dubiel, 49–60. Lanham, Maryland: Scarecrow Press, 2008. .
 Gloag, Kenneth. 2012. Postmodernism in Music. Cambridge Introductions to Music, Cambridge and New York: Cambridge University Press. .
 Harrison, Max, Charles Fox, Eric Thacker, and Stuart Nicholson. 1999. The Essential Jazz Records: Vol. 2: Modernism to Postmodernism. London: Mansell Publishing.  (cloth);  (pbk).
 Heilbroner, Robert L. 1961. The Future as History. New York: Grove Press.
 Hiekel, Jörn Peter. 2009. "Die Freiheit zum Staunen: Wirkungen und Weitungen von Lachenmanns Komponieren". Musik-Konzepte, no. 146 (July): 5–25.
 Hurley, Andrew W. 2009. "Postnationalism, postmodernism and the German discourse(s) of Weltmusik". New Formations, no. 66 (Spring): 100–117.
 Klemm, Eberhardt. 1987. "Nichts Neues unter der Sonne: Postmoderne". Musik und Gesellschaft 37, no. 8: 400–403.
 Ortega y Gasset, José. 1932. The Revolt of the Masses. New York & London: W. W. Norton & Company.  Online edition
 Pickstock, Catherine. 2011. "Quasi una sonata: Modernism, Postmodernism, Religion, and Music". In Resonant Witness: Conversations between Music and Theology, edited and introduced by Jeremy S. Begbie and Steven R. Guthrie, with an afterword by John D. Witvliet, 190–211. Calvin Institute of Christian Worship Liturgical Studies. Grand Rapids, MI: William B. Eerdmans. .
 Siōpsī, Anastasia. 2010. "On the Various Roles of Tradition in 20th-Century Greek Art Music: The Case Study of Music Written for Ancient Dramas". In Простори модернизма: Опус Љубице Марић у контексту музике њеног времена, edited by Dejan Despić, Melita Milin, Dimitrije Stefanović, and Danica Petrović, 197–214. Naučni skupovi, no. 130; Odelenje za likovne umetnosti i muziku, no. 7. Belgrade: Srpska Akademija Nauka i Umetnosti. .
  Taylor, Anthony. 2010. "John Adams' Gnarly Buttons: Context and Analysis: I". The Clarinet 37, no. 2 (March): 72–76.
 Varga, Bálint András, and Rossana Dalmonte. 1985. Luciano Berio: Two Interviews, translated and edited by David Osmond-Smith. London: Boyars. .
 Wellmer, Albrecht. 1991. The Persistence of Modernity: Essays on Aesthetics, Ethics and Postmodernism, translated by David Midgley. Cambridge [Massachusetts]: MIT Press. .

 
20th-century classical music
Contemporary classical music
music